Interleukin 15 receptor, alpha subunit is a subunit of the interleukin 15 receptor that in humans is encoded by the IL15RA gene.

Structure 

The IL-15 receptor is composed of three subunits: IL-15R alpha, CD122, and CD132.  Two of these subunits, CD122 and CD132, are shared with the receptor for IL-2, but IL-2 receptor has an additional subunit (CD25).  The shared subunits contain the cytoplasmic motifs required for signal transduction, and this forms the basis of many overlapping biological activities of IL15 and IL2, although in vivo the two cytokines have separate biological effects.  This may be due to effects of the respective alpha chains, which are unique to each receptor, the kinetics and affinity of cytokine-cytokine receptor binding, or due to the availability and concentration of each cytokine.

Function 

IL-15Ralpha specifically binds IL15 with very high affinity, and is capable of binding IL-15 independently of other subunits.  It is suggested that this property allows IL-15 to be produced by one cell, endocytosed by another cell, and then presented to a third party cell.

This receptor is reported to enhance cell proliferation and expression of apoptosis inhibitor BCL2L1/BCL2-XL and BCL2. Multiple alternatively spliced transcript variants of this gene have been reported. The full length sequences of only two variants encoding distinct isoforms are available.

Isoforms 

Several isoforms of the IL-15Ralpha protein have been detected. These isoforms can either result from alternative splicing of the mRNA encoding for the receptor or by shedding of the extra cellular domain of the receptor protein.

References

Further reading